AQI or Aqi may refer to:

 Air quality index
 "Al-Qaeda in Iraq", common English substitute name for the Iraq-based Tanzim Qaidat al-Jihad fi Bilad al-Rafidayn
 Australian Questioning Intonation, a feature of some accents of English
 AQ Interactive, a former Japanese video game developer and publisher
 A'Qi, a character from the wuxia novel The Deer and the Cauldron